Regional Council elections were held in Réunion in 2010 as part of the French regional elections. Although the Alliance for Réunion received the most votes in the first round, it was defeated by the OR–UMP–NC–LGM alliance in the second round. The OR–UMP–NC–LGM alliance won 27 of the 45 seats.

Results

References

Reunion
Reunion
Elections in Réunion
2010 in Réunion